First Nations in Manitoba constitute of over 130,000 registered people, about 60% of whom live on reserve. There are 63 First Nations in the province and five indigenous linguistic groups. The languages are Nēhiyawēwin, Ojibwe, Dakota, Oji-Cree, and Dene.

First Nations are listed by common usage names but other names may be applied in certain areas; for example, "Cree Nation" and "First Nation" is applied to certain bands on the same reserve.

Reserves in Manitoba 

There are about 63 reserves in Manitoba:

 Barren Lands First Nation
 Berens River First Nation
 Birdtail Sioux First Nation
 Bloodvein First Nation
 Brokenhead Ojibway Nation
 Buffalo Point First Nation
 Bunibonibee Cree Nation
 Canupawakpa Dakota First Nation
 Chemawawin Cree Nation
 Cross Lake First Nation
 Dakota Plains First Nation
 Dakota Tipi First Nation
 Dauphin River First Nation
 Ebb and Flow First Nation
 Fairford First Nation
 Fisher River Cree Nation
 Fox Lake Cree Nation
 Gamblers First Nation
 Garden Hill First Nation
 God's Lake First Nation
 Grand Rapids First Nation
 Hollow Water First Nation
 Keeseekoowenin Ojibway First Nation
 Kinonjeoshtegon First Nation
 Lake Manitoba First Nation
 Lake St. Martin First Nation
 Little Black River First Nation
 Little Grand Rapids First Nation
 Little Saskatchewan First Nation
 Long Plain First Nation
 Manto Sipi Cree Nation
 Marcel Colomb First Nation
 Mathias Colomb First Nation
 Mosakahiken Cree Nation
 Nisichawayasihk Cree Nation
 Northlands First Nation
 Norway House Cree Nation
 O-Chi-Chak-Ko-Sipi First Nation
 Opaskwayak Cree Nation
 Pauingassi First Nation
 Peguis First Nation
 Pinaymootang First Nation
 Pine Creek First Nation
 Poplar River First Nation
 Red Sucker Lake First Nation
 Rolling River First Nation
 Roseau River Anishinabe First Nation
 Sagkeeng First Nation
 Sandy Bay First Nation
 Sapotaweyak Cree Nation
 Sayisi Dene First Nation
 Shamattawa First Nation
 Sioux Valley Dakota Nation
 Skownan First Nation
 St. Theresa Point First Nation
 Swan Lake First Nation
 Tataskweyak Cree Nation
 Tootinaowaziibeeng First Nation
 War Lake First Nation
 Wasagamack First Nation
 Waywayseecappo First Nation
 York Factory First Nation

See also 
 Indian Reserves in Manitoba

External links
 Manitoba Chiefs website regarding the history of Treaties in Manitoba

 
First Nations
First Nations, Manitoba